Bojiště is a municipality and village in Havlíčkův Brod District in the Vysočina Region of the Czech Republic. It has about 300 inhabitants.

Administrative parts
Villages of Mstislavice and Veliká are administrative parts of Bojiště.

References

Villages in Havlíčkův Brod District